Kampen Zuid is a railway station in the Netherlands, located on the Lelystad–Zwolle railway, also known as the Hanzelijn. The station is located in the south of Kampen, Overijssel.

The station opened on 9 December 2012, with there being 2 platforms and 2 tracks.

Earlier station
Between 1 October 1913 and 15 May 1934 there also was a station called Kampen Zuid. This was at the end of the Kampen–Hattem railway line, which connected with the Zwolle–Apeldoorn railway line in Hattem.

Train services
, the following train services call at this station:
2× per hour local Sprinter service from The Hague to Leiden, Amsterdam, Almere, Lelystad, and Zwolle

Bus services
 11. Kampen Zuid Station to Flevowijk, Hagenbroek, and Kampen Station
 12. Kampen Zuid Station to Bovenbroek, and Kampen Station

See also
 Kampen railway station

External links
NS website
Dutch Public Transport journey planner

Railway stations on the Hanzelijn
Railway stations in Overijssel
Railway stations opened in 1913
Railway stations closed in 1934
Railway stations opened in 2012
Kampen, Overijssel
1913 establishments in the Netherlands
Railway stations in the Netherlands opened in the 20th century